Citreae is one of the two tribes of the flowering plant family Rutaceae, subfamily Aurantioideae, the other being Clauseneae.

Subtribes and genera
Three sub-tribes are included:
 Triphasiinae
 Luvunga Buch.-Ham. ex Wight & Arn.
 Merope M.Roem.
 Monanthocitrus
 Pamburus Swingle
 Paramignya Wight
 Triphasia
 Wenzelia Merr.
 Balsamocitrinae
 Aegle Corrêa – bael
 Aeglopsis Swingle
 Afraegle (Swingle) Engl.
 Balsamocitrus Stapf
 Feroniella Swingle
 Limonia L. – curd fruit
 Swinglea Merr.
 Citrinae
Atalantia
Burkillanthus 
Citropsis
Citrus
Clymenia (may belong in Citrus)
Hesperethusa
Naringi 
Poncirus – trifoliate orange (may belong in Citrus)
Pleiospermium
Severinia

Notable species in the Citrinae group include Bergamot orange, calamondin, citron, grapefruit, lemon, lime, orange, pummelo, tangelo, and tangerine, all of which are in the genus Citrus.

References

External links
 
 

Aurantioideae
Rosid tribes